Hebenton is a surname. Notable people with the surname include:

Andy Hebenton (1929-2019), Canadian ice hockey player
Clay Hebenton (born 1953), Canadian ice hockey player